Pliosauridae is a family of plesiosaurian marine reptiles from the Latest Triassic to the early Late Cretaceous (Rhaetian to Turonian stages) of Australia, Europe, North America and South America. The family is more inclusive than the archetypal short-necked large headed species that are placed in the subclade Thalassophonea, with basal forms resembling other plesiosaurs with long necks. They became extinct during the early Late Cretaceous and were subsequently replaced by the mosasaurs. It was formally named by Harry G. Seeley in 1874.

Relationships 
Pliosauridae is a stem-based taxon defined in 2010 (and in earlier studies in a similar manner) as "all taxa more closely related to Pliosaurus brachydeirus than to Leptocleidus superstes, Polycotylus latipinnis or Meyerasaurus victor". The family Brachauchenidae has been proposed to include pliosauroids which have very short necks and may include Brachauchenius and Kronosaurus. However, modern cladistic analyses found that this group is actually a subfamily of pliosaurids, and possibly even the "crown group" of Pliosauridae.

The following cladogram follows an analysis by Benson & Druckenmiller (2014).
<div class="noprint">

References

External links 

 

 
Hettangian first appearances
Turonian extinctions
Prehistoric reptile families